KGNG (channel 26) is a television station in Las Vegas, Nevada, United States, affiliated with HSN. It is owned by King Kong Broadcasting, with its transmitter located outside of Henderson on Black Mountain.

History 
The station began as K25DB, a construction permit granted in February 1992 to Terry Zick, for a low power operation to broadcast from Potosi Mountain, southwest of Las Vegas.  After several extensions of the construction permit, Zick sold the station in 1996 to King Kong Broadcasting, which had started the previous year with the goal of operating an Asian-language station.  The new owners immediately changed the station's call sign to KGNG, and the following year, moved the station from Potosi Mountain to Black Mountain, and from channel 25 to channel 47.  Shortly thereafter, the Federal Communications Commission (FCC) granted KGNG its license to operate.

The station filed for a digital companion channel construction permit in October 2006, to broadcast on UHF channel 48.  Digital programming began December 31, 2008.

Starting on September 23, 2018, KGNG has moved to channel 26.x.

Digital channels
The station's digital channel is multiplexed (Updated as of March 1, 2023):

References

External links

GNG-LD
Television channels and stations established in 1992
1992 establishments in Nevada
Buzzr affiliates
TheGrio affiliates
MeTV affiliates
Retro TV affiliates
True Crime Network affiliates
Low-power television stations in the United States